= A. M. Muhammed =

Indian writer (born 1958)

A. M. Muhammed (born 1958), is an Indian writer of Malayalam based in Abu Dhabi.

== Literary awards ==
- First Pravasi Literary Award – Government of Kerala (2006)
- Abu Dhabi Malayala Samajam Literary Award (2005)
- Pravasi Malayalee Development Society Thakazhi Memorial Literary Award (2006)
- Kerala Pravasi Malayali Returning Associations Literary Award
- Arabia Aksharashree Award

== Major works ==
=== Novels ===
- Sahara (2008)
- Nizhal Nilangal (2003)
- Marubhoomiyile Pakshi (2000)
- Kanyakashmir (2010)

=== Short story collections ===
- Vellimeghangalil Oru Thooval Kozhiyunnu (2003)
- Thakazhiyile Vellappokkathil Ozhuki Ozhuki Oru Manassu (2004)
- Ramanaliyar (2009)

=== Essay collections ===
- Nermugham (2008)
